Ibn Sina Trust is a non-profit welfare trust (organization) in Bangladesh and a major healthcare provider.

History
The Ibn Sina Trust was founded on 30 June 1980. Ibn Sina Trust founded several laboratories, hospitals, diagnostic centers, consultation centers, and pharmaceutical industries throughout Bangladesh. The Trust is believed to have close connections with the Islamist party of Bangladesh . On 30 April 2018 the Trust sold its shares in Islami Bank Bangladesh following a reshuffle of the bank administration.

Units
The Ibn Sina Trust has the following organizations:
 Ibn Sina Pharmaceutical Industry
Ibn Sina Diagnostic & Imaging Center, Dhanmondi
Ibn Sina Specialized Hospital Dhanmondi
 Ibn Sina Medical Imaging Center, Zigatola
IBN SINA Medical College Hospital, Kallyanpur
Ibn Sina Nursing Institute, Kallyanpur
 Ibn Sina D.Lab & Consultation Center, Doyagonj
Ibn Sina Diagnostic & Consultation Center, Badda
 Ibn Sina Diagnostic & Consultation Center, uttara, hotline Number 09610009612
 Ibn Sina Diagnostic Center Lalbagh Ltd
Ibn Sina Diagnostic & Consultation Center, Jessore
Ibn Sina Diagnostic & Consultation Center Bogra
Ibn Sina Diagnostic & Consultation Center, Malibag
Ibn Sina Diagnostic & Consultation Center, Savar
Ibn Sina Diagnostic & Consultation Center, Mirpur
Ibn Sina Hospital Sylhet ltd

References

Dhanmondi
Organizations established in 1980
1980 establishments in Bangladesh
Medical and health organisations based in Bangladesh
Hospitals in Bangladesh